A Fish pond or fishpond is a pond, artificial lake, or reservoir that is stocked with fish.

Fish pond, Fishpond  and Fishponds may also refer to:

Places
 Fishpond, Alabama, an unincorporated community in Coosa County
 Fishponds, a suburb of Bristol, England
 Fish Ponds, a location on the Mojave River in California

Other
 Fishpond, code name for a development of Fishpond, a World War II British radar system
 Fishpond.co.nz, a New Zealand e-commerce company